Broadcast Film Critics Association Awards 2012 may refer to:

 17th Critics' Choice Awards, the seventeenth Critics' Choice Awards ceremony that took place in 2012
 18th Critics' Choice Awards, the eighteenth Critics' Choice Awards ceremony that took place in 2013 and which honored the best in film for 2012